The Thomas Wilson was a whaleback freighter built in 1892 and used to haul bulk freight on the Great Lakes.  The ship sank in Lake Superior just outside the harbor of Duluth, Minnesota, United States, on 7 June 1902, after a collision with the George Hadley.  The wreck of the Thomas Wilson is one of the best remaining examples of a whaleback steamer, and it is also significant for the changes made in operating procedures at the Duluth harbor.  The remains of the ship were listed on the National Register of Historic Places in 1992.

Ship 

The whaleback was designed by Captain Alexander McDougall to carry cargoes of iron ore or grain economically around the Great Lakes. A pair of coal-fired Scotch boiler engines provided steam for the three-cylinder, triple expansion steam engine which drove a single screw propeller. The hull was built of heavy steel plates double-riveted to steel angle frames. The bow and stern were of a conoidal shape, with the center part of the hull being roughly cigar-shaped. The hatches on the deck had no coamings, vertical sections that would have prevented water from coming into the hatches. Instead the hatches were designed to be flush with the surface of the deck, and were simply bolted to the deck.

Sinking 

On 7 June 1902, the Thomas Wilson left the Duluth harbor carrying a load of Mesabi iron ore.  The hatches were not yet closed, because the weather was clear and calm.  Meanwhile, the George Hadley, a 2073-ton wooden steamer, was inbound for the Duluth harbor.  The Annie L. Smith tugboat directed the George Hadley to divert to the Superior harbor, since all of the Duluth coal docks were full.  The captain of the George Hadley ordered an immediate turn to port without noticing the direction of the Thomas Wilson or blowing the required whistle signals.  The captain of the Thomas Wilson, concerned about the movements of the Hadley but suspicious of running aground if he turned to port, ordered an immediate turn to starboard.  The Hadley struck the Wilson just forward of the aft hatch and recoiled from the collision.  The Wilson rolled over to port, then righted itself and began to sink by the bow.  Within three minutes, the entire ship had sunk, drowning nine of the twenty-man crew. The ship and its cargo were valued at $207,000.

As a result of the collision, new rules were instituted in the Duluth harbor:
 Ships cannot leave the harbor with open hatches.
 Ships may not pull out from another ship following a collision.
 Pilots may not carry out any order given by the captain when another vessel is sighted without first calling the captain's attention to the other vessel.
 All ships must be equipped with signal systems to all parts of the vessel to warn of danger.

The wreck today 

The stern of the ship is substantially complete, though a large section of the hull of the midship has been broken apart due to other ships dragging anchors through the wreck. The interior of the ship has survived largely intact, with relatively few items having been removed by divers. Some artifacts are on display at the Meteor Maritime Museum nearby in Superior, Wisconsin, together with information about the Thomas Wilson.

The wreck was listed on the National Register of Historic Places under the name Thomas Wilson (Whaleback Freighter) Shipwreck in 1992 for its state-level significance in the themes of engineering and maritime history.

References

External links

 

1892 ships
Duluth–Superior metropolitan area
Great Lakes freighters
Maritime incidents in 1902
National Register of Historic Places in St. Louis County, Minnesota
Ships built in Lorain, Ohio
Ships sunk in collisions
Shipwrecks of Lake Superior
Shipwrecks on the National Register of Historic Places in Minnesota
Whaleback ships
Shipwrecks of the Minnesota coast
Wreck diving sites in the United States